Verfassungsblog is an academic blog published in German and English, which focuses on the constitutional law of Germany and Europe in general.

Content
, a Berlin-based lawyer and journalist, opened the blog on 30 July 2009, stating that his blog was the first German-language blog on constitutional law. Beginning as a personal blog, Steinbeis soon invited others to publish their contributions on the website. The blog initially focused on German law, eventually broadening its focus to constitutional law in Europe. In 2011, it began to cooperate with the Berlin Institute for Advanced Study. Verfassungsblog publishes content in four categories: blog posts, debates between multiple scholars, podcasts, and an editorial section. It is open access and all content published on the website receives a DOI for long-time archival. More than 1,000 people have published on the blog; contributors include Jürgen Habermas, Pedro Cruz Villalón, Giuliano Amato, and Yuval Shany. As of 2020, Steinbeis is still the chief editor of the blog.

Reception
The "Recht im Kontext" research association's external evaluation described the blog as "one of the most interesting and most widely read forums for constitutional law and policy" and a "must read" for legal scholars who research constitutional law in Europe. The School of Transnational Governance at the European University Institute described the blog as "one of the leading blogs on constitutional law in Europe". Der Tagesspiegel described it as "an important discourse platform for European law".

The 2020 European Commission rule of law report stated that Verfassungsblog is "A widely read platform for discussions on rule of law related topics [that] has gained in importance over
recent years and has become a forum for both domestic as well as European discussions on the rule of law."

Verfassungsblog has been cited in case law, including by Germany's Federal Court of Justice and the Supreme Court of Poland.

References

External links

German-language websites
English-language websites
2009 establishments in Germany
Constitutional law journals
European law journals
Internet properties established in 2009